The 2012 Merthyr Tydfil County Borough Council election took place on 3 May 2012 to elect members of Merthyr Tydfil County Borough Council in Wales.  This was on the same day as other 2012 United Kingdom local elections. The Council shifted from Independent to Labour.

Results

|}

The Liberal Democrats lost all the gains they had made in 2008. The Independent coalition council leader also lost his seat.

Ward results

Bedlinog

Cyfarthfa

Dowlais

Gurnos

Merthyr Vale

Independent coalition leader of the council, Jeff Edwards, lost his seat at this election.

Park

Penydarren

Plymouth

Town

Treharris

Vaynor

References

2012
Merthyr Tydfil